Gravelly Hollow is a valley in northern Taney County in the Ozarks of southwest Missouri. The stream in the valley is a tributary to Bull Creek.

The stream source area lies adjacent to Missouri Route H at approximately 1150 feet and the confluence about four miles to the west is at 837 feet.

Gravelly Hollow was so named on account of deposits of gravel within the valley.

References

Valleys of Taney County, Missouri
Valleys of Missouri